Arman Serikuly Kenesov (born 4 September 2000) is a Kazakhstani football player who plays for Aktobe.

Club career
He made his debut in the Kazakhstan Premier League for FC Irtysh Pavlodar on 29 July 2018 in a game against FC Shakhter Karagandy.

On 7 August 2020, FC SKA-Khabarovsk announced the signing of Kenesov on a three-year contract. On 18 January 2021, he was loaned to Kaisar until November 2021.

On 14 December 2021, he moved to Aktobe.

References

External links
 
 Profile by Russian Football National League
 

2000 births
People from Pavlodar
Living people
Kazakhstani footballers
Kazakhstan youth international footballers
Kazakhstan under-21 international footballers
Association football midfielders
FC Irtysh Pavlodar players
FC SKA-Khabarovsk players
FC Kaisar players
FC Aktobe players
Kazakhstan Premier League players
Russian First League players
Kazakhstani expatriate footballers
Expatriate footballers in Russia
Kazakhstani expatriate sportspeople in Russia